Diana Page (born 1965) is a painter, performance and installation artist originally from South Africa but currently residing in Istanbul, Turkey. Exploring experiences of traveling back and forth between these two homes, Page's artwork concerns ideas of globalization and nomadic lifestyle. Through painting, drawing, performance, installation, and video, Page investigates the urban environments she inhabits as an emotional as well as physical setting.

Career
In 2022, Page's solo exhibit, Walking on a rim of light, which including wall-based paintings and photographic and digital prints, was exhibited at the Oliewenhuis Art Museum (the Reservoir) from 24 February to 10 April 2022.

Education
Page has a BA Honours from University of Natal, 1986, a HDE from University of Cape Town, 1987, and a Master in Fine Arts from Rhodes University, 1992.

Exhibitions
Infecting the City Public Art Festival, Cape Town, 2012
Its Liquid:Liquid Cities and Invisible Identities 2012, Venice
Between Colour and Line, Diana Page & Joicy Koothur 2012, Ouvroir d'Art, Istanbul
Then Now Next Diana Page & Justin Eccles Ouvroir dArt, Beyoglu, Istanbul
 Ships & Dreams Arnavutkoy Art Gallery, Istanbul, 2010
 Produced a performance piece "Pitch Blue" in Redhook, Brooklyn (Axis Gallery), 2008
 Sound Installation "Kadinin Sesleri", Galata, Istanbul, 2007
 360Istanbul, Beyoglu, Istanbul, 2007
Unknown Cities, Buchanan Square, Woodstock, Cape Town, 2006 
 Irma Stern, Diana Page & Jane Young, 2005
Association of Visual Arts, Cape Town, 2003
Karen McKerron Gallery, Johannesburg, 2001
Feeling the spaces Chelsea Gallery Cape Town, 1996
Pilgrims Chelsea Gallery Cape Town, 1995
Going Home Market Galleries Johannesburg, 1993
Going Home Grahamstown Arts Festival, 1992

Photo gallery

References

External links
http://www.hurriyetdailynews.com/default.aspx?pageid=438&n=south-african-artist-depicts-merging-moments-in-istanbul-2011-01-13
https://web.archive.org/web/20160305000724/http://www.todayszaman.com/newsDetail_getNewsById.action?load=detay&link=204228
Infecting the City, 2012:
https://www.flickr.com/photos/infectingthecity/6820427746/in/photostream
https://www.flickr.com/photos/infectingthecity/6966561871/
https://www.flickr.com/photos/infectingthecity/6845873423/in/photostream
 Walking on a Rim of Light: http://issuu.com/fashionnl/docs/dianapage

1965 births
Living people
Artists from Durban
Women performance artists
20th-century South African women artists
21st-century South African women artists